Turkish Electricity Distribution Corporation (Turkish: Türkiye Elektrik Dağıtım A.Ş. or TEDAŞ) is a distribution network operator for electricity covering Turkey. It has Electricity Distribution Companies across the country. In 2021 it was criticized for its accounting.

References 

Electric power distribution network operators
Electric power in Turkey